Canter Brown Jr. is an American historian, professor and author. He was born in Fort Meade, Florida, and earned his degrees at Florida State University. He has taught at Florida A&M University and has worked at Fort Valley State University in Fort Valley, Georgia. He wrote a book about Florida's African American public officials from 1867 until 1924.

Brown has written on Florida and southern United States history, including Florida's Peace River Frontier, earning him the  Florida Historical Society's Rembert W. Patrick Award, and Ossian Bingley Hart: Florida's Loyalist Reconstruction Governor, winner of the Certificate of Commendation of the American Association of State and Local History, about Ossian B. Hart, one of Florida's Reconstruction era governors.

Bibliography 
The Supreme Court of Florida, 1917-1972 (2007) co-authored with Walter Manley
None Could Have Richer Memories: Polk County Since 1940 (Tampa, 2004)
In the Midst of All That Makes Life Worth Living: Polk County to 1940 (Tallahassee, 2001) 
Laborers in the Vineyard of the Lord: The Beginnings of the AME Church in Florida, 1865-1895 (Gainesville, 2001) with Larry E. Rivers. 
Cracker Times and Pioneer Lives: The Florida Reminiscences of George Gillett Keen and Sarah Pamela Williams (Columbia, 2000) with James M. Denham 
The Supreme Court of Florida and Its Predecessor Courts, 1821-1917 (1998) co-authored with Walter Manley 
Florida's Black Public Officials, 1867-1924, Tuscaloosa (1998)
Ossian Bingley Hart: Florida's Loyalist Reconstruction Governor, Baton Rouge (1997)
Fort Meade, 1849-1900 (Tuscaloosa, 1995)
Florida's Peace River Frontier, Orlando (1991)
Mary Edwards Bryan : Her Early Life and Works by Canter Brown Jr. and Larry Eugene Rivers
Henry Bradley Plant: Gilded Age Dreams for Florida and a New South by Canter Brown Jr.
Tampa in Civil War and Reconstruction by Brown, Canter, Jr.

References

Living people
21st-century American historians
21st-century American male writers
People from Fort Meade, Florida
Florida State University alumni
Florida A&M University faculty
Fort Valley State University faculty
Year of birth missing (living people)
Historians from Florida
American male non-fiction writers